José Luis Jair Soria (born September 12, 1971) is a Mexican retired luchador or professional wrestler, who works under the ring name Shocker. He currently works for Consejo Mundial de Lucha Libre in Mexico and has previously worked for AAA in Mexico, Total Nonstop Action Wrestling, in the United States and New Japan Pro-Wrestling in Japan. Soria is a second-generation professional wrestler; his father, Rubén Soria, was an active wrestler from 1963 to the 1970s.

Working as Shocker, he has held the CMLL World Tag Team Championship on three occasions, with Negro Casas, Mr. Niebla and L.A. Park. He is also a former holder of the CMLL World Light Heavyweight Championship, the NWA World Light Heavyweight Championship (twice) and the NWA World Historic Light Heavyweight Championship. He has won the Gran Alternativa tournament in 1995, the Copa de Arena México in 2001, La Copa Junior in 2005 and CMLL Copa Revolución Mexicana in 2011.

He is talked about in a Netflix movie Lucha Mexico. He appears in the first season of An Idiot Abroad, where Karl Pilkington was sent by show producers Ricky Gervais and Stephen Merchant to Mexico to see one of the Seven Wonders of the World, Chichen Itza. While he was there, he was tasked with learning how to wrestle. Soria was his trainer.

Professional wrestling career
José Luis Jair received his initial professional wrestling training from the highly respected pro wrestling trainer Diablo Velasco as well as his father, Ruben Soria, prior to his in-ring debut. He worked his first match on October 16, 1992, using the ring name Shocker, an enmascarado or masked wrestler. He later trained under then-Consejo Mundial de Lucha Libre lead trainer El Satánico.

Consejo Mundial de Lucha Libre (1994–2005)

Shocker began working for CMLL in 1994, and by 1995, he slowly began receiving a push from the promoters when he won the Gran Alterntiva tournament along with his partner, Silver King, in 1995. He capped off the year by defeating veteran Kahoz for his mask in a Lucha de Apuestas, or bet match on December 15. The push continued when he won the NWA World Light Heavyweight Championship, defeating Black Warrior for the championship in 1997.

In 1998, he began teaming regularly with Mr. Niebla, and together they won the CMLL World Tag Team Championship. The two later had the championship taken away from them when Mr. Niebla suffered a severe injury. In 1999, Shocker's career was further elevated when he turned heel and began storyline feud with Mr. Niebla. The feud culminated in a match at the CMLL 66th Anniversary Show, where Shocker and Mr. Niebla were paired up for a Parejas Suicidas ("Suicide Pairs") match against another pair of feuding partners, Atlantis and Villano III. The rules were that the losing team had to face each other immediately after losing the match in a mask vs. mask match. Shocker and Niebla lost the match and Shocker lost the subsequent Lucha de Apuesta match, losing his mask as a result.

After losing his mask, Shocker was pushed even more, capitalizing on his good looks. He took the nickname "1000% Guapo", or "1000% Handsome". He joined up Bestia Salvaje and Scorpio Jr. to form Los Guapos ("The Hansome Ones") in 2000. Shocker later had a falling out with his tag team partners, and he had a heel vs. heel feud along with partners like Los Capos (Cien Caras, Universo 2000 and Máscara Año 2000) and El Satánico. In 2003, he started a new version of Los Guapos with frequent tag team partner Máscara Mágica and El Terrible and feuded with the original Guapos members Bestia Salvaje, Scorpio Jr. and Emilio Charles Jr. who were now wrestling as Los Talibanes ("the Taliban").

The feud peaked with a six-man cage match where El Terrible defeated Bestia Salvaje, forcing him to be shaved bald as a result. By 2004, Shocker was a full-time babyface teaming with L.A. Park and trading the CMLL World Tag Team Championship with Último Guerrero and Rey Bucanero. In June of that year, El Terrible broke away from Los Guapos and won the hair of Máscara Mágica. Terrible's replacement, Alan Stone hardly teamed with Shocker and Máscara Mágica afterward, and Los Guapos was effectively ended by the end of 2004. For most of the summer, he joined up with Perro Aguayo Jr. and Negro Casas in a feud against Pierroth Jr., Vampiro Canadiense and Tarzan Boy. The feud ended in a steel cage match where Perro Aguayo Jr. defeated Negro Casas for his hair. In 2005, he started out the year well winning the La Copa Junior, a trophy for second-generation wrestlers with a finals win over Dr. Wagner Jr.

Total Nonstop Action Wrestling (2005–2006)
In April 2005, Shocker joined Total Nonstop Action Wrestling based in Orlando, Florida, around the same time Mexican TNA regular Héctor Garza, who was blocked from entering the United States after steroid problems. In one of his early matches with TNA, Shocker unsuccessfully challenged Christopher Daniels for the TNA X Division Championship at TNA's Hard Justice pay-per-view. In 2006, TNA made Shocker the captain of Team Mexico, which also included Puma, Magno and Incognito for the 2006 TNA World X Cup Tournament. Shocker and Magno defeated the team of Eric Young and Johnny Devine from Team Canada, but in the end the team came in third in the standings after being unsuccessful in the World X Cup finals at TNA's 2006 Sacrifice PPV. The tournament final turned out to be Shocker's last match with the company.

AAA (2005–2006)

While working for TNA, Shocker decided to leave CMLL, after having worked for them for 10 years, to work for CMLL's Mexican AAA alongside wrestlers such as Vampiro. In AAA, he started a feud with Cibernético, with the storyline being started when Cibernético attacked Shocker's father who was at ringside for one of Shocker's matches.

The feud reached its high point with a four-way Lucha de Apuestas match that included Shocker, Cibernético, Latin Lover and Chessman. The match was a steel cage match, with the added stipulation that the cage was supposedly electrified. The four faced off in the main event of AAA's 2005 Verano de Escándalo ("Summer of Scandal") PPV and saw Chessman lose the match to Latin Lover, while Shocker escaped the match without losing his hair.

Following the conclusion of the storyline with Cibernético, Shocker turned rudo, attacking veteran Sangre Chicana. The storyline was that Shocker claimed that he was the real Amo de escandalo ("Master of Scandal"), which was Chicana's nickname at that point. The two faced off in a hair vs. hair match at the El Toreo de Cuatros Caminos bullfighting arena in Naucalpan, State of Mexico, with Shocker defeating Sangre Chicana in the semi-main event of the 2005 Guerra de Titanes ("War of the Titans").

In 2006, Shocker formed Los Guapos VIP in AAA, consisting of himself, Scorpio Jr. and Zumbido. The trio participated in a four-way trios match at the 2006 Rey de Reyes ("King of Kings") show, but were eliminated before the end of the match. Los Guapos later expanded with Alan Stone, allowing them to wrestle The Black Family (Chessman, Dark Ozz, Dark Cuervo and Dark Escoria) for the Mexican National Atómicos Championship on March 19, 2006, but were unsuccessful. In August 2006, Shocker left AAA.

Return to CMLL (2007–2022)
Shocker jumped ship from AAA back to Consejo Mundial de Lucha Libre again in 2007. That same year, he teamed with Perro Aguayo Jr. and Héctor Garza in a failed bid to win the vacant CMLL World Trios Championship from Último Guerrero, Tarzan Boy and Atlantis in Mexico City on September 29, 2006. In early 2007, he entered a championship tournament for the vacant NWA International Junior Heavyweight Championship and lost to Hirooki Goto at the tournament finals in Mexico City on March 4. He and Dr. Wagner Jr. lost to Perro Aguayo Jr. and Héctor Garza in a match for the vacant WWA World Tag Team Championship in Tijuana on January 31, 2008.

Shocker has defeated a number of wrestlers in Luchas de Apuestas (bet matches), including Máscara Año 2000, Tarzan Boy, Vampiro Canadiense, Halloween, Kenzo Suzuki, Marco Corleone, Emilio Charles Jr., Bestia Salvaje, Mazada, Nosawa, Sangre Chicana, Rey Bucanero, and Black Warrior. On December 14, 2010, Shocker defeated El Texano Jr. to win the NWA World Historic Light Heavyweight Championship, which predecessor, the NWA World Light Heavyweight Championship, he had already held twice before.

However, just five days later, he suffered a patellar tendon rupture and a meniscal tear in his knee that required surgery and would sideline him for 12 to 16 weeks. On May 26, 2011, Shocker was stripped of the NWA World Historic Light Heavyweight Championship. He would finally make his CMLL in-ring return on July 24. On November 16, Shocker formed a new group with Metro and CMLL newcomers Titán and Tritón. The group dissolved soon after being announced as Shocker was injured and Metro adopted a new ring persona, Diamante Azul.

In late 2012, the long-dormant rivalry between Shocker and his former tag-team partner Mr. Niebla rose to the surface again as the two began to work on opposite sides of a number of matches, with increasing intensity and animosity from both wrestlers. The two were paired up for the 2013 Torneo Nacional de Parejas Increibles as a way to continue the storyline. The team worked together without too many problems in the initial rounds as they defeated the teams of Marco Corleone and Kraneo and the team of Máscara Dorada and Mephisto to qualify for the semi-finals. In the semi-finals they lost to eventual tournament winners La Sombra and Volador Jr. Following the loss, Shocker and Mr. Niebla argued and almost came to blows over who was responsible for losing the match. On July 19 at Infierno en el Ring, Shocker won Mr. Águila's hair in a ten-man steel cage Lucha de Apuestas. In early 2014, Shocker turned rudo, just so he could feud with Rush.

On March 21, 2014, at Homenaje a Dos Leyendas, Shocker lost his hair for the first time, when he was defeated by Rush in a Lucha de Apuestas. On June 13, Shocker and Negro Casas defeated Rush and La Máscara to win the CMLL World Tag Team Championship. On April 3, 2015, Shocker, El Terrible and Rey Bucanero formed a new trio named TGR (Terriblemente Guapo y un Rey, "Terribly Handsome King").

In early 2016, Shocker suffered an injury that would require surgery and keep him out of the ring for almost six months. CMLL opted to not strip Shocker and Casas of the tag team championship during the long period of inactivity, which meant that there was eight months between the team defending the championship. Shocker and Casas successfully defended the championship against Atlantis and Diamante Azul on June 5, La Máscara and Sharlie Rockstar on July 18, and Místico and Volador Jr. on September 19, 2016. On February 14, 2018, CMLL vacated the CMLL World Tag Team Titles due to lack of defences since 2016.

Championships and accomplishments
Arena Pista
Arena Pista Revolucion New Wave Tournament (1994)
Comisión de Box y Lucha de Guadalajara
Occidente Light Heavyweight Championship (1 time)
Occidente Trios Championship (1 time) – with León Dorado and Ídolo I
Consejo Mundial de Lucha Libre
CMLL World Light Heavyweight Championship (1 time)
CMLL World Tag Team Championship (3 times) – with Mr. Niebla (1), L.A. Park (1), and Negro Casas (1)
NWA World Light Heavyweight Championship (2 times)
NWA World Historic Light Heavyweight Championship (1 time)
Copa de Arena México (2001) – with Black Warrior and Apolo Dantés
La Copa Junior (2005)
Copa Revolución Mexicana (2011)
Torneo Gran Alternativa (1995) – with Silver King
International Wrestling Revolution Group
Copa Higher Power (1998) – with Mr. Niebla, El Pantera, El Solar, Star Boy and Mike Segura
Pro Wrestling Illustrated
PWI ranked him # 16 of the 500 best singles wrestlers of the PWI 500 in 2002

Luchas de Apuestas record

Footnotes

References

1971 births
Living people
Masked wrestlers
Mexican male professional wrestlers
People from Guadalajara, Jalisco
People from Cerritos, California
Professional wrestlers from Jalisco
Professional wrestlers from California
20th-century professional wrestlers
21st-century professional wrestlers
CMLL World Light Heavyweight Champions
CMLL World Tag Team Champions
NWA World Historic Light Heavyweight Champions
NWA World Light Heavyweight Champions